Tubao, officially the Municipality of Tubao, is a 4th class municipality in the province of La Union, Philippines. According to the 2015 census, it has a population of 28,729 people.

Formerly known as the "Home of the Native Tobacco", Tubao was famous for its tobacco leaf and cigars. It had a tobacco trade for decades where its town center was littered by huge tobacco warehouses and trading posts for tobacco. Today, corn is its prime agricultural output where Chichacorn is among its by-products.

The town has an average annual income of PHP 42,803,624 pesos.

Etymology 
"Legend states that Tubao got its name when the Spaniards led by one Father Luis Gonzaga y Espinosa, in their desire to spread Christianity, headed towards the eastern parts of Agoo. At that time, these parts of Agoo were hinterlands and heavily forested. While the Spaniards were resting under the full-grown trees, they distributed manuscripts of the cartilla and catecismo to the natives. Suddenly, they heard a loud chorus of sound "TUAO, TUAO", emanating from the top of the trees. These sounds made by the birds locally known as kalaw, (the rufous hornbill, Buceros hydrocorax) attracted and bewildered the Spaniards. Even as the Spaniards went further east, the sound persisted. When Father Espinosa returned from their journey, he reported an area called "TUAO." However, due to inadvertent recordings made by the Spanish authorities, the word "TUAO" was written as "TUBAO", hence, the name of the place."

History

Founding 

Tubao is an interior town in the southern part of the province of La Union that surfaced in the mid-1880s. It was a barrio in the eastern boundaries of Agoo and Aringay. The place was a former visita of the parish of Agoo. During the Spanish period, a visita was a settlement with a church but was visited periodically by a non-resident clergy whose headquarters was at the mother town. The early settlers of the barrio called it San Isidro de Tubao in honor of its patron saint whose feast is celebrated every May 14 and 15 of the year.

On March 28, 1873, residents of this huge settlement composed of nine barrios from Agoo (Macoton, Amboot, Caoigue, Pideg, Damosil, Masalip, Linapew, Anduyan and Ambañgonan) together with six other barrios from Aringay] (Santa Theresa, Copang, Calopaan, Bugarin, Guinitaban and San Pascual) petitioned for the creation of a new municipality.

Pugo, then part of Tubao was called Rancheria Tulosa. It was in 1883 that quail (locally known as pugo) hunters who frequented the place changed the name into Rancheria Pugo after the birds.

However, it was not until July 20, 1885, when a superior decreto embodied in the expediente of August 28, 1885 created the new town of Tubao. On August 21, 1885, La Union Spanish Military Governor Federico Francia proposed a review of the petition to redefine the border limits of Aringay.

On November 10, 1885, real orden No. 901 affirmed the July 20th superior decreto. On November 16, 1885, Francia acknowledged the existence of the "nuevo pueblo de Tubao" from the barrios that were yielded by Agoo and Aringay. Hence, Tubao became the 14th town of La Union. Four months later, on March 8, 1886, Governor Federico Francia inaugurated the town.

2012 assassination attempt
Tubao Mayor Dante Garcia survived an assassination attack when he escaped unscathed from an ambush early on September 9, 2012, along the Aspiras National Highway in Barangay Lloren, Tubao.  But Attorney Lazaro Gayo, a former vice mayor of the town and an aspiring candidate for Sangguniang Panlalawigan was murdered.

The Civil Society Group (CSG) and the La Union police therefore held a rally at Freedom Park in Agoo to protest the series of unsolved extrajudicial killings in Tubao and Agoo. The public indignation was led by Reverend Mariano C. Apilado of Peace Builders La Union, Melvin Macusi of Amnesty International, Danilo Balino from the Commission on Human Rights and Fr. Leo Nedic of TIGNAY-PPCRV, other human rights Groups, Kanlungan, Bannuar and leaders of the Catholic and Protestant Churches.

Tubao Parish and the legacy of the Belgian missionaries 

During the Spanish period until the 20th century, religion (Roman Catholicism) played a major role in the life of the people of Tubao. Tubao was a visita of the Parish of Agoo. A chapel and a convento of light materials were erected in 1884. Ten years later, the parish of Tubao was founded. Its first pastor, Father Juan Garcia arrived only after two years, in the month of March 1896. The cause of the delay was the subsidy to be voted upon in the Cortes Generales of Madrid. The missionary started gathering materials for a new church and a convento but could not carry out his plan as he left already in January 1898; it would take more than 30 years before these projects would materialized.

On March 8, 1900, during the tense period of the Philippine–American War, the people of Tubao petitioned against the return of the friars.

Up to 1912, the condition of the young parish was unstable and precarious. The priests did not stay long and several times, Tubao was without a spiritual father. In 1908, it became again a visita, but of Aringay this time.

Conditions were better in Pugo. Although smaller and never given a pastor in the Spanish time, it had a Dutch-born resident priest since 1909, Rev. Gerard Martens. When Tubao lost its priest once more in 1911, the pious Christians sent a petition to the bishop requesting his excellency to send a missionary of the Congregation of the Immaculate Heart of Mary (Congregatio Immaculati Cordis Mariae) in case no Filipino priest should be available. They had to be patient for a few months. About 20 November 1911, Father Morice Vanoverbergh arrived from Bauko, a CICM sister mission of Bontoc. His stay was short. About 8 February 1912, he learned that Father Jules Sepulchre, one of the founders of the mission in Bontoc and Bauko became ill upon his return to Bauko. Father Vanoverbergh went on horseback to visit him climbing the Santo Tomas mountain and arrived in Bauko on 14 February just in time for the burial. Father Jules Sepulchre died in Bontoc Hospital the day before. Father Vanoverbergh was asked by his superior to take over that mission. After two months, Father Martens was transferred to Tubao and stayed for eighteen years.

During his stint, Father Martens extended the boundaries of the church yard and constructed the main part of the church. He built and rebuilt in 1916 the chapel in barangay Santa Teresa and gave a school chapel to Caoigue in 1917 and an ermita to Anduyan in 1926. He acquired the rectory which was put up in Spanish time. He also started a primary school in Anduyan and Caoigue in 1913. In June 1915, he opened a Grade I class on the ground floor of the rectory or convent to be later named Tubao Catholic School and conducted a parish census. A Belgian missionary from the same congregation (Congregatio Immaculati Cordis Mariae) Rev. Father Charles Beurms, assisted Father Martens and became the first director of the school. Father Martens also founded "The Apostleship of Prayer" (1912) and "Los Defensores de la Libertad" which later became the "Cabsat ni San Isidro."

In 1922, the first group of Belgian missionary sisters of the Immaculate Heart of Mary (Immaculati Cordis Mariae) arrived headed by Mother Marie Andrea and followed by Mother Marie Ambroise in 1923. The latter became the first principal for the Tubao Catholic high school with the opening of the First Year class. In 1924, the Second Year class was added.

The lot on which the church building and the convent of the Sisters were built on was bought from Doña Laureana Novicio de Luna, mother of the famous Luna brothers -- Juan Luna and Antonio Luna.

In was in 1923 when the priests acquired the house of Don Urbano Dacanay for P1,000 pesos, west of the plaza, and housed in it the newly founded Tubao Catholic High School. It was named the Msgr. Martens Building. This building was destroyed in World War II during the liberation from the Japanese occupation. In January 1951, Father Albert Van Nuffelen sold the lot back for P1,800 pesos to the relatives of the former owner viz., Mr. Bernardino Madriaga and Milagrina Oller who built their house on it.

From 1930 to 1933, during Father Alois Proost's term, the church sanctuary and sacristies were completed. He donated the big church bells. He organized a scout band, a string band and the first and best girl scout unit in the Philippines. He also added Third and Fourth year classes in the Tubao Catholic High School established by Father Martens before. A primary school was also opened in Pideg (1931) and Amallapay (1933?).

From 1934 to 1935, Father Morice Van Overbergh installed the tiled floors on the church. He was a scholar and did outstanding work in botany, anthropology and linguistics.

The parish priests expanded the church yard and bought more lots in the 1920s up to the 1950s. In 1927, a land was bought from Baltazar Dulay for P200 pesos, north of the church. A few years later, the sacristy was built on this property. Another lot, west of the sacristy, was bought from Don Francisco Zandueta (La Union Governor from 1910 to 1912) and was partly occupied by a bamboo warehouse for storing tobacco rented by Chan Chin Ko Baltazar, father of Florencio Chan Baltazar who later became municipal mayor. The warehouse was converted into three classrooms for boys of the intermediate class. In 1940, Father Carlos Desmet procured the means to have a new school building within the premises to replace the old bamboo shack. It was the Sancho Building named after Msgr. Sancho, the bishop of Nueva Segovia who helped with the means. Again, this building was razed to the ground during the war. Today the area is an open field of the school.

More lots were acquired from Doña Maxima Zarate in October 1950 by Father Albert Van Nuffelen where the present high school building now stands; Alfredo Milanes, Felix Garcia, Teodoro Ramos, Timoteo Ramos for the lots at the eastern side of the church in 1951. The northern section of the school garden was bought from Valeriano Mapalo by Father Jose de Hayes in 1957.

During the Japanese occupation from 1942 to 1944, classes were suspended. In as much as the bombs destroyed the old Martens and Sancho buildings, primary classes were sought in the house of Benedicto Verceles, southeast of the rectory or convent while intermediate and high school classes were held in the convent. 

Father Albert Van Nuffelen, parish priest from 1949 to 1954 constructed two new buildings and named these the new Martens and Sancho buildings, south and north of the present basketball court which he also built.

In 1954, Father Jose de Hayes became parish priest and school director. He proposed the school to have a Christian name. In 1956, Tubao Catholic School was renamed San Alberto Magno Academy (SAMA) in honor of Saint Albert the Great and his predecessor, Father Albert Van Nuffelen.

In 1963, Father Henry Geeroms initiated and sought means to construct another building which was located at the back of the Sancho building to house a library, a laboratory and four classrooms.
Today, that building has been demolished and a new building now has been constructed in its place.

During the Golden Jubilee in 1965, the school populace was 1,393 including the 115 pupils of Caoigue. But enrollment gradually dwindled due to the opening of free public schools in the different barangays. Elementary classes were phased out in 1973 due to financial constraint.

In 1966, Father Jaime Quatannens, organize the credit union/cooperative to find an alternative lending facility other than those provided by unscrupulous moneylenders.  On August 13, 1966, with 39 pioneer-members and a starting paid-up capitalization of Three hundred fourteen pesos (P 314.00), the Tubao Credit Union, Inc. as originally named was formally organized and registered with the Cooperative Administration Office (CAO) under RA 2023 and approved on October 26, 1966, under Registration No. 001503.

After 68 years, the Belgian CICM and ICM sisters handed the school administration in 1984 to the Diocese of San Fernando, La Union and the last ICM principal was Sister Cleofe Bacon who left in 1998.

The Sancho building was damaged by the July 16, 1990 earthquake and was renovated. Only the first floor remains of the original building built by Father Van Nuffelen. The Martens building now houses the Saint Isidore School for grade school classes which was revived in the late 1990s.

1896 (Heritage) St. Isidore the Farmer Parish Church 

As of 2012, the St. Isidore the Farmer Parish Church of Tubao (canonically erected in 1896),  2509 La Union, celebrates its fiesta every May 15. It is under the jurisdiction of the Roman Catholic Diocese of San Fernando de La Union (Dioecesis Ferdinandopolitana ab Unione, Suffragan of Lingayen – Dagupan, which was created on January 19, 1970, and erected on April 11, 1970, comprising the Civil Province of La Union, under the Titular, St. William the Hermit, February 10). The Church is under a diocese of the Latin Church of the Roman Catholic Church in the Philippines from the Archdiocese of Nueva Segovia.

The Tubao Church is under the Vicariate of St. Francis Xavier with Vicar Forane, Fr. Joel Angelo Licos.

The Church was rehabilitated and renovated in 1980 under Jose D. Aspiras.

On December 30, 1996, Fr. Noel C. Mabutas, Parish Priest and Mr. Jose C. Taveres, Parish Council President signed the Centennial Marker in the Church Door, under the lead of Archbishops Oscar V. Cruz, Antonio R. Tobias, D.D. and Antonio Ll. Mabutas, D.D. with the Centennial Executive Board.

The 1954 Our Lady of Lourdes Grotto (built by Fr. Albert Van Nuffelen, CICM, on 1954) was enthroned with Marker on February 11, 2005, by Rev. Camilo P. Villanueva, Parish Priest.

On December 30, 2006, 110th Anniversary of the Church the Trailblazer Memorial honoring the Centennial Celebration of the CICM - RP 1911–1982, 7 Decades, was erected on the Church door, and blessed by Bishop Antonio Rillera, S.V.D., D.D.

Other notable events 
 During the Philippine–American War, on November 19, 1899, General Samuel Baldwin Marks Young, American commander in Northern Luzon marched through Tubao to Aringay then to Agoo. Later he "spent a week galloping in and out of Tubao and Salcedo" in pursuit of General Emilio Aguinaldo and his forces.
 Capt. Santiago Fontanilla, headed 130 men with four officers and 87 rifles. He fought against the Americans. When he narrowly escaped capture in Kapangan, he abandoned personal equipment which included a horse and Colt .45 pistol both belonging to Colonel Gutierrez, his commander.
 During World War II, the town became a center for all evacuees who fled their homes in the neighboring municipalities. Because of its mountainous terrain on the east, it was also an ideal site for the guerrillas who fought the Japanese forces.

 Among those who found refuge and passage in the town were top officials of the land led by then Executive Secretary Manuel Roxas who was later captured by the Japanese in 1942, Senator Quintin Paredes, Speaker Laurel and Teofilo Sison.
 Notable among the events that transpired in this town was the establishment of a Japanese garrison beside the Roman Catholic Church. Even the residence of former Mayor Antonio Verceles became the staff house of all the Japanese officers. Hence, its preservation from the mass burning of houses during the Japanese retreat.
 On June 17, 1962, President Diosdado Macapagal inaugurated the multi-million peso Masalip River Irrigation Project together with First Lady Eva Macapagal.
 In 1974, then Tourism Minister Jose Aspiras brought Miss Universe Amparo Muñoz of Spain and other beauties to Tubao for a tour.

Geography
An inland land-locked town, Tubao is located in Region I lying along the south-eastern side of La Union province. It is bounded on the north by Aringay, on the east by Pugo, on the south-west by Santo Tomas, on the south by Rosario, and on the west by Agoo.

Rural topography is seventy percent (70%) alluvial plains and thirty percent (30%) uplands. Flat lands are found in the middle portion of the town, in between its southern and northern hilly sections.

Slope 

 0-8 percent where slope of land is nearly level and gently sloping accounts 2,664 hectares. Most of these are located in Santa Teresa, Leones East, Poblacion and Gonzales with some part of Linapew, Francia Sur, Halog East and lower lands of Rizal;
 8-30 percent slope which are rolling to moderately steep with the lowest share of 60 hectares, mostly found in Halog East and West;
 30-50 percent slope of land which are steep comprising an area of 1,070 hectares and are found in Amallapay, Pideg and some part of Lloren, Magsaysay and Anduyan;
 50 percent and above are very steep slopes of land found mostly in Rizal and the boundary lines of Pideg, Linapew and Amallapay. This accounts 1,427 hectares.

Climate 
The climate prevailing in the municipality is characterized by two distinct seasons, dry from November to April and wet during the rest of the year.

Annual main rainfall as recorded by PAGASA is 217.8 ml with a peak of 1,059.6 millimeters in December. The mean temperature is 27.5 Celsius. It rises to as high as 29.2 Celsius in May and goes down as low as 25 Celsius in January. Monthly average number of rainy days is 11.2, while relative humidity is 78.9.

Direction of the wind blowing in the area is mostly from south-west to north-east due to south-west monsoons. The area has a natural shield of winds blowing from the east because of the Cordillera mountain ranges. During summer, in the absence of any weather disturbance, wind blows from west to east as natural sea breeze.

Soil type 

Soil types are found as follows: San Manuel silt loam in Barangay Santa Teresa with an approximate area of 336 hectares; Umingan Clay loam in Poblacion and Anduyan; Barcelona Clay in Barangay Leones; Mountain soils, annam clay loam and Bauang clay in Santa Teresa, Halog, Gonzales, Anduyan, Linapew and Garcia.

Barangays 
Tubao is politically subdivided into barangays. These barangays are headed by elected officials: Barangay Captain, Barangay Council, whose members are called Barangay Councilors. All are elected every three years.

Demographics

Economy

Government
Just as the national government, the municipal government of Tubao, is divided into three branches: executive, legislative and judiciary. The judicial branch is administered solely by the Supreme Court of the Philippines. The LGUs have control of the executive and legislative branch.

The executive branch is composed of the mayor and the barangay captain for the barangays.

The legislative branch is composed of the Sangguniang Bayan (town assembly), Sangguniang Barangay (barangay council), and the Sangguniang Kabataan for the youth sector.

The seat of Government is vested upon the Mayor and other elected officers who hold office at the Tubao Town hall. The Sanguniang Bayan is the center of legislation, stationed in Tubao Municipio.

Elected officials

List of former Chief Executives 
For 378 years, from 1521 to 1899, Local Chief Executives of the “pueblos” or towns were appointed by the Spaniards and in the year 1901 up to 1910 they were appointed by the Americans. Afterwards, election was the mode of selection.

Early local government was covered by the Maura Law which was passed in 1893 that changed the title or designation of town heads from gobernadorcillo to capitan municipal. It was ruled by the members of the Tribunal Municipal, the "cabezas de barangay" and the "principales" (the local oligarchy as delegates), who elect the members of the Tribunal Council.

The following local officials held the positions either as Tenientes Absolute Gobernadorcillos, Capitanes, Presidentes Municipal and Municipal Mayors, for the terms opposite their respective names:

Municipal town halls

Gallery

References

External links

 [ Philippine Standard Geographic Code]
 Philippine Census Information
 Local Governance Performance Management System

Municipalities of La Union